Ronald McCluskey (3 November 1936 – 23 June 2011) was a Scottish footballer, who played as a goalkeeper.  McCluskey played for East Fife, Accrington Stanley and several English non-league clubs during his career.

References

Sources
Scottish Football Historian, issue 119, page 25.

External links
Ronnie McCluskey, www.neilbrown.newcastlefans.com

1936 births
2011 deaths
East Fife F.C. players
Accrington Stanley F.C. players
Association football goalkeepers
Scottish Football League players
English Football League players
People from Johnstone
Footballers from Renfrewshire
Scottish footballers